The Nokia 5110 is a GSM mobile phone that was introduced by Nokia on 12 April 1998.

The 5110, also known as Nokia 5146 on One2One (now T-Mobile), or the nk402 on Orange in the UK, was intended for the consumer market, succeeding Nokia 3110 and the analogue Nokia 232. Its design is based on the same platform as Nokia 6110 for the business market. It features a similar, simpler, revamped user interface called Series 20, but lacked the infrared data interface. It can, however, be interfaced with a computer via a cellular data card and a proprietary cable, enabling it to function like a modem  to connect to remote computer systems through the Public switched telephone network (PSTN).

The Nokia 5110 features an 84×48-pixel monochrome LCD with four LED backlights, operated by the Philips PCD8544 display controller.

It is the first Nokia phone to come with replaceable faceplates, which Nokia branded "Xpress-on" covers; a concept Nokia incorporated into several other consumer-oriented cellphones aimed at the young adult market for years to come, allowing users to customize their device. "Xpress-on" was trademarked in the U.S. on 25 February 1998.

The Nokia 5110 is also one of the first mobile phones to feature the game Snake. It became one of the most popular phones of its era.

The Nokia 5110 was discontinued by the year 2000, having been fully replaced by the smaller Nokia 3210.

Variants

In the Asia Pacific region, Nokia launched a successor to the 5110, the 5110i. The 5110i has longer talk and standby times, and had a more ergonomic, redesigned, silicone keypad.

While the Nokia 5110 operates only on 900MHz GSM networks, the 5130 operates on 1800MHz GSM networks instead. It was marketed by Orange UK as the nk402.

The North American variant of this handset is Nokia 5190, which is a 1900 MHz-only GSM handset. Nokia 5125 is the North American version of the 5110i.

Nokia 5160/Nokia 5165 with TDMA/IS-136 service on 800 MHz and 1900 MHz and analog AMPS service at 800 MHz is the same handset form. Nokia 5120/5125 is a TDMA/IS-136 handset that operates on 800 MHz, and also on AMPS at 800 MHz.

Nokia 5180i/Nokia 5185i are CDMA/AMPS handsets.

In Brazil, Gradiente manufactured a variant of the Nokia 5120 under license as the Gradiente Strike.

References

See also

Lists
 List of Nokia products
 List of acquisitions by Nokia

5110
Mobile phones introduced in 1998